Teodoro Lonfernini (born 12 May 1976) is a Sammarinese politician and former Captain Regent. He held the post from 1 October 2012 to 1 April 2013, with Denise Bronzetti. He was previously a member of the Grand and General Council.

Lonfernini was the second captain regent of this name, the previous one having served in 1944–1945; see List of Captains Regent of San Marino.

References

1976 births
Captains Regent of San Marino
Living people
Members of the Grand and General Council
Sammarinese Christian Democratic Party politicians